Pahneh Bor or Pahneh Bar may refer to:
 Pahneh Bar, Hamadan
 Pahnehbor, Hamadan Province
 Pahneh Bor, Shirvan and Chardaval, Ilam Province
 Pahneh Bor, Shirvan, Shirvan and Chardaval County, Ilam Province
 Pahneh Bor, Kurdistan